KXKU 106.1 FM is a radio station licensed to Lyons, Kansas.  The station broadcasts a country music format and is owned by Ad Astra Per Aspera Broadcasting, Inc.

References

External links

XKU
Country radio stations in the United States